Porte de Versailles is a station on Line 12 of the Paris Métro, as well as the southern terminus of Île-de-France tramway Line 2 and a stop on Île-de-France tramway Line 3a in the 15th arrondissement. Nearby are the Paris expo Porte de Versailles and Dôme de Paris indoor sports venue.

History

Métro station
The station was opened on 5 November 1910 as part of the stage of Line A of the Nord-Sud Company from Porte de Versailles to Notre-Dame-de-Lorette. The line was taken over by the Métro network in 1930; it became Line 12. It was the southern terminus of the line until the extension of the line to Mairie d'Issy on 24 March 1934. The station was relocated during the extension and the area of the old station is now occupied by storage sidings. It is named after the Porte de Versailles, a gate in the nineteenth century Thiers wall of Paris, which led to the city of Versailles.

Tramway stop
The Île-de-France tramway Line 3 (now 3a) stop opened on 16 December 2006 as part of the initial section of the tramway between Pont du Garigliano and Porte d'Ivry. Île-de-France tramway Line 2 was extended from Issy – Val de Seine to Porte de Versailles on 21 November 2009.

Station layout

Gallery

References
Roland, Gérard (2003). Stations de métro. D’Abbesses à Wagram. Éditions Bonneton.

Paris Métro stations in the 15th arrondissement of Paris
Railway stations in France opened in 1910